The following outline is provided as an overview of and topical guide to forgery:

Forgery – process of making, adapting, or imitating objects, statistics, or documents with the intent to deceive.

Types of forgery
 Archaeological forgery
 Art forgery
 Black propaganda — false information and material that purports to be from a source on one side of a conflict, but is actually from the opposing side
 Counterfeiting
 Counterfeit money — types of counterfeit coin include the cliché forgery, the fourrée and the slug
 Counterfeit consumer goods
 Counterfeit medication
 Counterfeit watches
 Unapproved aircraft parts
 Watered stock
 False documents
 Forgery as covert operation
 Identity document forgery
 Fake passport
 Literary forgery
 Fake memoirs
 Pseudopigraphy — the false attribution of a work, not always as an act of forgery
 Musical forgery — music allegedly written by composers of past eras, but actually composed later by someone else
 Philatelic forgery — fake stamps produced to defraud stamp collectors
 Signature forgery

Legality of forgery

Kenya
 Forgery of Foreign Bills Act 1803
 Forgery Act 1830
 Forgery, Abolition of Punishment of Death Act 1832
 Forgery Act 1837
 Forgery Act 1861
 Forgery Act 1870
 Forgery Act 1913
 Forgery and Counterfeiting Act 1981

International
 Anti-Counterfeiting Trade Agreement
 Council of Europe Convention on the Counterfeiting of Medical Products

Related offences
 Phishing — impersonating a reputable organization via electronic media, which often involves creating a replica of a trustworthy website
 Uttering — knowingly passing on a forgery with the intent to defraud

Detection and prevention of forgery

Anti-counterfeiting agencies and organisations
 Authentics Foundation — an international non-governmental organization that raises public awareness of counterfeits
 Central Bank Counterfeit Deterrence Group — an international group of central banks that investigates emerging threats to the security of banknotes
 Counterfeit Coin Bulletin — a now-defunct publication of the American Numismatic Association
 Alliance Against Counterfeit Spirits — the trade association for the worldwide spirit industry's protection against counterfeit produce
 Philatelic Foundation — a major source of authentication of rare and valuable postage stamps 
 United States Secret Service — the agency responsible for the prevention and investigation of counterfeit U.S. currency
 Verified-Accredited Wholesale Distributors — a program that offers accreditation to wholesale pharmaceutical distribution facilities

Tools and techniques
 Authentication — the act of confirming the truth of an attribute of a single piece of data claimed true by an entity.
 Counterfeit banknote detection pen — uses an iodine-based ink that reacts with the starch found in counterfeit banknotes
 EURion constellation — a pattern of symbols incorporated into banknote designs, which can be detected by imaging software
 Geometric lathe — a 19th-century lathe used for making ornamental patterns on the plates used in printing banknotes and stamps
 Microprinting — very small text hidden on banknotes or cheques, that is difficult to accurately reproduce
 Optical variable device — an iridescent image that cannot be photocopied or scanned
 Optically variable ink — ink that appears to change color depending on the angle it is viewed from
 Philatelic expertisation — the process whereby an expert is asked to give an opinion whether a philatelic item is genuine
 Questioned document examination — a forensic science discipline that attempts to answer questions about disputed documents
 Security printing — the field of the printing industry that deals with the printing of items such as banknotes and identity documents
 Security thread — a thin ribbon threaded through a banknote, that appears as a solid line when held up to the light
 Taggant — a radio frequency microchip that can be tracked and identified
 Watermark — a recognizable image or pattern in paper that appears as various shades of lightness when viewed

Examples of forgery

Archaeological forgery
 Acámbaro figures — over 32,000 ceramic figurines which appear to provide evidence for the co-existence of dinosaurs and humans
 Archaeoraptor — the supposed "missing link" between birds and tetrapod dinosaurs; constructed by rearranging pieces of genuine fossils
 AVM Runestone — a student prank that was believed to be an ancient Norse runestone
 Beringer's Lying Stones — fake fossils that were planted as an 18th-century prank
 Brandenburg stone — a stone slab bearing markings which appear to be letters of an unknown alphabet
 Calaveras Skull — a human skull that was thought to prove the existence of Pliocene-age man in North America
 Cardiff Giant — a ten-foot-tall "petrified man" carved out of gypsum
 Chiemsee Cauldron — a golden cauldron found at the bottom of a lake
 Crystal skull — a series of artifacts crafted from quartz, often attributed to Aztec or Mayan civilizations
 Drake's Plate of Brass — supposedly a brass plaque planted by Francis Drake upon arrival in America, but a practical joke that spun out of control
 Grave Creek Stone — a small sandstone disk inscribed with twenty-five pseudo-alphabetical characters
 Holly Oak gorget — a mammoth engraved upon a shell pendant
 Ica stones — a collection of andesite stones that depict dinosaurs co-existing with humans
 Japanese Paleolithic hoax — many paleolithic finds manufactured by amateur archaeologist Shinichi Fujimura to bolster his reputation
 Kafkania pebble — a small rounded pebble bearing what could be an early example of Greek syllabic writing
 Kinderhook plates — six bell-shaped pieces of brass with strange engravings; Latter-Day Saints founder Joseph Smith allegedly attempted to translate them
 Lead Books of Sacromonte — a series of texts inscribed on circular lead leaves, denounced as heretical forgeries by the Vatican in 1682; modern scholars concur with this analysis
 Lenape Stone — an engraving that appears to show Native Americans hunting a woolly mammoth
 Michigan relics — artifacts that appear to prove that East Europeans lived in Michigan in ancient times; a money-making scam
 The inscription at Pedra da Gávea — allegedly carved by Phoenicians, who were not thought to have had the naval capacity to travel across the ocean to Brazil 
 Persian Princess — the mummified body of a "Persian princess"; the corpse of a woman who was murdered around 1996
 Piltdown Man — the jaw of an orangutan attached to the skull of a human, hailed as the missing link between humans and apes
Sherborne Bone — a bone with a horse's head engraved on it, now known to be a schoolboy prank
 Solid Muldoon — a "petrified human" made out of the mortar, rock dust, clay, plaster, ground bones, blood, and meat
 Spirit Pond runestones — small stones bearing runic inscriptions, ostensibly of pre-Columbian origin
 Tiara of Saitaferne — a tiara exhibited at the Louvre Museum as belonging to a Scythian king, until this statement was disputed by the goldsmith who created it
 Vinland map — an allegedly 15th-century map of the world, which would have been be the earliest map to depict America (or "Vinland")

Art forgery
 Amarna Princess — a statue created by Shaun Greenhalgh in the ancient Egyptian style, and sold to Bolton Museum for £439,767
 Black Admiral — a Revolutionary War-era painting of a black man in a naval uniform
 Bust of Flora — a bust of the Roman goddess Flora, previously believed to be a work by Leonardo da Vinci, now attributed to Richard Cockle Lucas.
 Camille Corot forgeries — thousands of imitation Jean-Baptiste-Camille Corot paintings
 Eadred Reliquary — a silver vessel created by Shaun Greenhalgh, containing a piece of wood which he claimed was a fragment of the True Cross
 Etruscan terracotta warriors — three terracotta warriors created by Italian forgers and sold to the Metropolitan Museum of Art
 The Faun — a sculpture created by Shaun Greenhalgh and sold as a work by Paul Gauguin
 Flower portrait — a portrait of William Shakespeare, probably painted in the 19th century
 Michelangelo's Cupid — a sleeping Cupid sculpture that was created, artificially aged and sold by Renaissance artist Michelangelo
 Risley Park Lanx — the replica of a genuine Roman artifact, "discovered" by the Greenhalgh family and put on display at the British Museum
 Rospigliosi Cup — a gold and enamel cup thought to have been crafted by Italian goldsmith Benvenuto Cellini, but now considered a 19th-century forgery
 The works of the Spanish Forger — an unidentified 19th-century artist who created over 200 medieval miniatures, which are still highly valued by collectors

Black propaganda
 The Franklin Prophecy — an anti-Semitic speech falsely attributed to Benjamin Franklin, arguing against the admittance of Jewish immigrants to the newly formed United States
 Morey letter — a letter published during the 1880 US presidential elections, suggesting that James A. Garfield was in favor of Chinese immigration 
 Our Race Will Rule Undisputed Over The World — a speech given by the non-existent Rabbi Emanuel Rabinovich, outlining Jewish plans for world domination
 A Protocol of 1919 — a document supposedly found among the belongings of a Jew killed in battle, outlining Jewish plans for world domination
 The Protocols of the Elders of Zion — a lengthy text, originating in Russia and widely publicized by the Nazi party, outlining Jewish plans for world domination
 A Radical Program for the Twentieth Century — a text supposedly written by a British Jewish Communist, cited as proof that the civil rights movement in America was a foreign Communist plot
 Tanaka Memorial — an alleged Japanese strategic planning document, advising Emperor Hirohito on how to conquer the world

Counterfeiting
 2012 Pakistan fake medicine crisis — a batch of counterfeit medicine that killed over 100 heart patients at a hospital in Punjab
 Counterfeit United States currency — some notable examples of counterfeit operations
 Fake Indian Currency Note — fake currency in circulation in the Indian economy
 Operation Bernhard — a Nazi plot to destabilize the British economy by dropping counterfeit notes out of aircraft
 Superdollar — a very high-quality counterfeit the United States hundred dollar bill
 Partnair Flight 394 — a chartered flight that crashed in 1989, killing all 55 people on board; it was caused by counterfeit aircraft parts
 Unauthorized Apple Stores in China — twenty-two unauthorized Apple Stores discovered in Kunming

Forged documents
 Canuck letter — a letter implying that a Democratic presidential candidate was prejudiced against French-Canadians
 Casket letters — letters and sonnets supposedly written by Mary, Queen of Scots, implicating her in the murder of her husband
 Donation of Constantine — a decree issued by emperor Constantine I, granting authority over Rome and part of the Roman Empire to Pope Sylvester I and his successors 
 Dossiers Secrets — documents, planted in the National Library of France, that were used as the basis for a series of BBC documentaries
 Habbush letter — a letter linking Saddam Hussein to al-Qaeda and the 9/11 attacks
 Killian documents — memos critical of President George W. Bush's service in the National Guard
 Larmenius Charter — a Latin manuscript listing twenty-two successive Grand Masters of the Knights Templar
 Lindsay pamphlet scandal — pamphlets distributed by the Australian Liberal Party, claiming an alliance between the Labor Party and an Islamic organization
 Mustafa-letter — a letter used by Norway's Liberal Party to prove that the country was in danger of being overrun with Muslims
 Niger uranium forgeries — documents implying that Saddam Hussein had attempted to purchase yellowcake uranium powder, allegedly to build weapons of mass destruction
 Oath of a Freeman — a copy of the loyalty oath drawn up by 17th-century Pilgrims
 Privilegium Maius — a medieval manuscript boosting the legitimacy and influence of the House of Habsburg
 Pseudo-Isidorian Decretals — letters and canons purportedly authored by early popes, including a collection authored by "Benedict Levita".
 William Lynch speech — a speech by an 18th-century slave owner, who claims to have discovered the secret of controlling slaves by pitting them against each other
 Zeno map — a map of the North Atlantic containing many non-existent islands
 Zinoviev letter — a directive from Moscow to Britain's Communist Party, calling for intensified communist agitation; the letter contributed to the downfall of Prime Minister MacDonald

Literary forgery
 The Aquarian Gospel of Jesus the Christ — a religious text supposedly transcribed from the Akashic records
 The Archko Volume — a series of supposedly contemporary reports relating to the life and death of Jesus
 Autobiography of Howard Hughes — an "autobiography" of reclusive eccentric Howard Hughes, written without his knowledge or consent
 Book of Jasher — an alternative account of the Old Testament narrative
 Book of Veles — a set of Slavic texts written on wooden planks
 Centrum Naturae Concentratum — a 17th-century alchemical text
 Christine — a compilation of letters purportedly written by an English girl studying in Germany in 1914, before the outbreak of war
 Chronicle of Huru — supposedly an official chronicle of the medieval Moldavian court 
 Chronicon of Pseudo-Dexter — a 15th-century account of the Church's activities in Spain, attributed to Flavius Dexter
 De Situ Britanniae — an 18th-century forgery represented as a Roman account of ancient Britain
 Epistle to the Alexandrians — an unknown text derided as a forgery in a 7th-century manuscript
 Epistle to the Laodiceans — a lost letter of Saint Paul, often "rediscovered" by forgers
 Essene Gospel of Peace — a text which claims, among other things, that Jesus was a vegetarian
 Gospel of Josephus — a forgery created to raise publicity for a novel
 Historias de la Conquista del Mayab — a Mexican manuscript supposedly written by an 18th-century monk
 History of the Captivity in Babylon — an ostensibly Old Testament text elaborating on the Book of Jeremiah
 Hitler Diaries — a set of volumes purported to be the diaries of Adolf Hitler, serialized in the German magazine Stern and the British Sunday Times
 Ireland Shakespeare forgeries — forged correspondence between Shakespeare and his contemporaries, and a "lost play" entitled Vortigern and Rowena
 Jack the Ripper Diary — the forged diary of Victorian merchant James Maybrick, apparently revealing him to be Jack the Ripper
 Letter of Benan — the letter of an Egyptian physician describing his encounters with Jesus
 Letter to an Anti-Zionist Friend — a letter in support of Zionism, attributed to Martin Luther King, Jr.
 The Lost Chapter of the Acts of the Apostles — the "missing" 29th chapter of the Acts of the Apostles
 Memoirs Of Mr. Hempher, The British Spy To The Middle East — a document purporting to be the account of an 18th-century secret agent, describing his role in founding the Islamic reform movement of Wahhabism
 Manuscripts of Dvůr Králové and Zelená Hora — fraudulent Slavic manuscripts created in the early 19th century
 Minuscule 2427 — a minuscule manuscript of the Gospel of Mark
 Mussolini diaries — several forged diaries supposedly written by the Italian dictator Benito Mussolini 
  My Sister and I — an autobiographical work attributed to the philosopher Nietzsche, containing a probably fictional account of his incestuous relationship with his sister
 Oahspe: A New Bible — a New Age bible written by an American dentist
 Ossianic poems — a cycle of epic poems published by the Scottish poet James Macpherson, attributed to the legendary Ossian
 Roxburghe Ballads — over a thousand 17th-century ballads published by John Payne Collier, some of which he had written himself 
 Salamander Letter — a document that offers an alternative account of Joseph Smith's finding of the Book of Mormon.
 Sixth and Seventh Books of Moses — a magical text supposedly written by Moses, providing instructions on how to perform the miracles portrayed in the Bible
 The Songs of Bilitis — a collection of erotic poetry allegedly found on the walls of a tomb in Cyprus
 Supplements to the Satyricon — several forged versions of the Latin novel Satyricon
 Talmud Jmmanuel — a supposedly ancient Aramaic text suggesting an extraterrestrial origin for the Bible
 The Zohar — a primary text of medieval Kabbalah, written by a 16th-century Spanish Rabbi but attributed to Rabbi Shimon Bar Yochai, an ancient sage of the Second Temple period

Musical forgery
 Adélaïde Concerto — a violin concerto attributed to Mozart

Philatelic forgery
 Russian philatelic forgeries — some examples of notable Russian stamp forgeries
 Stock Exchange forgery 1872–73 — a fraud perpetrated by telegraph clerks at the London Stock Exchange
 Turner Collection of Forgeries — a collection of forged postage stamps on display at the British Library

Forgery controversies
The authenticity of certain documents and artifacts has not yet been determined and is still the subject of debate.

 Augustan History — a collection of biographies of Roman emperors
 Bat Creek inscription — an inscription on a stone allegedly found in a Native American burial mound
 Isleworth Mona Lisa — a close imitation of da Vinci's Mona Lisa, sometimes attributed in part to da Vinci
 James Ossuary — a chalk box used to contain the bones of the dead, bearing the inscription "James, son of Joseph, brother of Jesus"
 Jehoash Inscription — an inscription confirming the Biblical account of the repairs made to the temple in Jerusalem by Jehoash
 Jordan Lead Codices — a series of ring-bound books of lead and copper, that are said to pre-date the writings of St. Paul
 Kensington Runestone — a slab of greywacke covered in Scandinavian runes, found in North America and supposedly carved in the 14th century
 Letter of Lentulus — an epistle allegedly written by a Roman Consul, giving a physical description of Jesus
 Majestic 12 documents — supposedly leaked papers relating to the formation, in 1947, of a secret committee of US officials to investigate the Roswell incident 
 Mar Saba letter — an epistle, attributed to Clement of Alexandria, discussing the Secret Gospel of Mark
 Newark Holy Stones — a set of artifacts allegedly discovered among a group of ancient Indian burial grounds
 Old High German lullaby — a supposedly 10th-century poem containing numerous references to Germanic mythology
 Prophecy of the Popes — a series of 112 short cryptic phrases which purport to predict future Roman Catholic Popes
 Shroud of Turin — a linen cloth that is said to be the burial shroud of Jesus, and bears the image of a man who appears to have suffered injuries consistent with crucifixion
 Sinaia lead plates — a set of lead plates written in an unknown language
 Sisson documents — sixty-eight Russian documents which claim that Trotsky and Lenin were German agents attempting to bring about Russia's withdrawal from World War I
 Stalin's alleged speech of 19 August 1939 — a speech supposedly given by Joseph Stalin in which he stated that the approaching war would benefit the Soviet Union 
 Titulus Crucis — a piece of wood, ostensibly a fragment of the True Cross upon which Jesus was crucified
 US Army Field Manual 30-31B — a text purporting to be a classified appendix of a US Army Field Manual which describes top-secret counter-insurgency tactics

Some documents and artifacts were previously thought to be forgeries, but have subsequently been determined to be genuine.

 Bords de la Seine à Argenteuil — an oil painting by Monet
 Glozel artifacts — over three thousand artifacts dating back to the Neolithic era, discovered in a small French hamlet
 Lady of Elche — a stone bust believed to have been carved by the Iberians
 Praeneste fibula — a golden brooch bearing an inscription in Old Latin

Notable forgers

Archaeological forgers
 Charles Dawson (1864–1916) — "discoverer" of the Piltdown Man
 Shinichi Fujimura (born 1950)
 Oded Golan (born 1951) — accused of forging the James Ossuary, among other things; he was acquitted of these charges in March 2012
 Islam Akhun
 Brigido Lara
 Moses Shapira (1830–1884)

Art forgers
 Giovanni Bastianini (1830–1868)
 William Blundell (born 1947)
 Chang Dai-chien (1899–1983)
 Yves Chaudron
 Alceo Dossena (1878–1937)
 John Drewe (born 1948)
 Kenneth Fetterman
 Alfredo Fioravanti (1886–1963)
 Shaun Greenhalgh (born 1961) — described by the Metropolitan Police as "the most diverse art forger known in history"
 Guy Hain
 Eric Hebborn (1934–1996)
 Elmyr de Hory (1905–1976) — subject of the Orson Welles documentary F for Fake
 Geert Jan Jansen (born 1943)
 Tom Keating (1917–1984)
 Konrad Kujau (1938–2000) — the author of the Hitler Diaries
 Mark A. Landis (born 1955)
 Lothar Malskat (1913–1988)
 Han van Meegeren (1889–1947) — estimated to have earned the equivalent of over thirty million dollars for his forgeries 
 Jacques van Meegeren (1912–1977)
 John Myatt (born 1945)
 Sámuel Literáti Nemes (1796–1842)
 Edmé Samson (1810–1891)
 Ely Sakhai (born 1952)
 Jean-Pierre Schecroun
 Émile Schuffenecker (1851–1934)
 Karl Sim (born 1923)
 David Stein (1935–1999)
 Tony Tetro (born 1950)
 Robert Thwaites
 Franz Tieze (1842–1932)
 William J. Toye (born 1931) 
 Eduardo de Valfierno — allegedly masterminded the 1911 theft of the Mona Lisa
 Kenneth Walton (born 1967) — author of the memoir Fake: Forgery, Lies, & eBay
 E. M. Washington (born 1962)
 Theo van Wijngaarden (1874–1952)

Counterfeiters
 Philip Alston (c. 1740 – after 1799)
 Anatasios Arnaouti (born 1967)
 Trevor Ashmore
 Robert Baudin (1918–1983)
 Charles Black (1928–2012)
 William Booth (c. 1776 – 1812)
 Mary Butterworth (1686–1775)
 William Chaloner (c. 1665 – 1699)
 Louis Colavecchio 
 The Cragg Vale Coiners
 Thomas Dangerfield (c. 1650 – 1685)
 Mike DeBardeleben (1940–2011)
 John Duff (c. 1759 – 1799)
 Edward Emery (died c. 1850)
 David Farnsworth
 Bernhard Krüger (1904–1989) — director of the Nazi counterfeiting plot codenamed Operation Bernhard
 Ignazio Lupo (1877–1947)
 Catherine Murphy (died 1789) — the last woman to be executed by burning.
 Emanuel Ninger (1845–1927)
 Bernard von NotHaus — inventor of the Liberty Dollar
 Salomon Smolianoff (1899–1976) — WWII concentration camp detainee and key figure in Operation Bernhard
 Samuel C. Upham (1819–1885)
 Arthur Williams

Document forgers
 Frank Abagnale (born 1948) — subject of the film Catch Me If You Can
 Charles Bertram (1723–1765) — author of De Situ Britanniae
 Joseph Cosey (1887 – c. 1950)
 Przybysław Dyjamentowski (1694–1774)
 Michael John Hamdani 
 Adolfo Kaminsky (born 1925)
 Jean LaBanta (born c. 1879)
 Maharaja Nandakumar (died 1775)
 Richard Pigott (1835–1889)
 Piligrim (died 991)
 James Reavis (1843–1914)
 Alves dos Reis (1898–1955)
 Scott Reuben (born 1958)
 William Roupell (1831–1909)
 William Wynne Ryland (c. 1738 – 1783)
 Michael Sabo
 Alexander Howland Smith (fl. 1886)
 Robert Spring (1813–1876)
 Adolf Ludvig Stierneld (1755–1835)
 Brita Tott (fl. 1498)
 Lucio Urtubia (born 1931)
 Denis Vrain-Lucas (1818–1880)
 Henry Woodhouse (1884–1970)

Literary forgers
 Annio da Viterbo (c. 1432 – 1502)
 Sir Edmund Backhouse, 2nd Baronet (1873–1944)
 Adémar de Chabannes (c. 988 – 1034)
 Thomas Chatterton (1752–1770)
 Mark Hofmann (born 1954) — forger of several documents relating to the Latter Day Saint movement, including the Salamander letter
 William Henry Ireland (1775–1835) — author of the Ireland Shakespeare forgeries and the pseudepigraphical play Vortigern and Rowena
 Clifford Irving (1930–2017)
 William Lauder (c. 1680 – 1771)
 James Macpherson (1736–1796) — the supposed "translator" of the Ossianic poems
 Iolo Morganwg (1747–1826)
 François Nodot (c. 1650 – 1710)
 Francesco Maria Pratilli (1689–1763) 
 Constantine Simonides (1820–1867)
 Clotilde de Surville (fl. 1421)
 Charles Weisberg (died 1945)

Musical forgers
 Henri Casadesus (1879–1947)
 Marius Casadesus (1892–1981) — creator of the Adélaïde Concerto
 François-Joseph Fétis (1784–1871)
 Fritz Kreisler (1875–1962)
 Winfried Michel (born 1948)
 David Popper (1843–1913)
 Roman Turovsky-Savchuk (born 1961)
 Vladimir Vavilov (1925–1973)
 Voller Brothers (1885-1927)

Signature forgers
 Henry Fauntleroy (1784–1824)
 James Townsend Saward (1799 – after 1857)

Stamp forgers 

 A. Alisaffi
 Bernhardt Assmus (c. 1856 – after 1892)
 Rainer Blüm
 Delandre (1883–1923)
 Georges Fouré (1848–1902)
 François Fournier (1846–1917)
 Sigmund Friedl (1851–1914)
 Julius Goldner (c. 1841 – 1898)
 N. Imperato
 Madame Joseph (c. 1900 – after 1945)
 Louis-Henri Mercier (fl. 1890)
 Erasmo Oneglia (1853–1934)
 Adolph Otto (fl. 1870)
 Angelo Panelli (c. 1887 – c. 1967)
 Oswald Schroeder (died c. 1920) 
 Lucian Smeets
 Jean de Sperati (1884–1957)
 Philip Spiro
 Béla Székula (1881–1966)
 Raoul de Thuin (1890–1975)
 Harold Treherne (c. 1884 – after 1908)

Media
 The Art of the Faker — a book about art forgery by Frank Arnau
 The Counterfeiters — a movie inspired by the Nazi counterfeiting scheme, Operation Bernhard
 F for Fake — an Orson Welles documentary about art forger Elmyr de Hory
 Fake Britain — a BBC television series about counterfeiting and its effects on consumers
 Fake: Forgery, Lies, & eBay — a memoir by art forger Kenneth Walton
 Fake or Fortune? — a BBC television series which examines the provenance of notable artworks
 Frauds, Myths, and Mysteries: Science and Pseudoscience in Archaeology — a book by Kenneth L. Feder on the topic of pseudoarcheology
 Pierre Grassou — a novel by Honoré de Balzac about a fictional art forger
 Selling Hitler — an ITV drama-documentary about the Hitler Diaries

External links 
 Sources of information on art forgery, Museum Security Network

Forgery
Forgery
Forgery